The Allen County Regional Transportation Authority is the primary provider of mass transportation in Lima, Ohio. Six routes provide standard weekday service, while an express bus runs as a seventh line to nearby Delphos, Ohio during rush hour.

Routes
American Mall
Delphos Express
East Kibby/Rhodes State College
North Main
South Main
West North Street
Westside/Medical Center

References
ACRTA

Bus transportation in Ohio
Transit agencies in Ohio